A woven coverlet or coverlid (derived from Cat. cobre-lit) is a type of bed covering with a woven design in colored wool yarn on a background of natural linen or cotton.  Coverlets were woven in almost every community in the United States from the colonial era until the late 19th century.

History
Coverlets of 18th century America were twill-woven with a linen warp and woolen weft.  The wool was most often dyed a dark blue from indigo, but madder red, walnut brown, and a lighter "Williamsburg blue" were also used.

From the turn of the 19th century, simple twill-woven coverlets gave way to patterned hand-woven coverlets made in two different ways:

Overshot weave coverlets were made with a plain woven undyed cotton warp and weft and repeating geometric patterns made with a supplementary dyed woolen weft.  Made on a simple four-harness loom, overshot coverlets were often made in the home and remained a common craft in rural Appalachia into the early 20th century.

Double-cloth coverlets were double-woven, with two sets of interconnected warps and wefts, requiring the more elaborate looms of professional weavers.  Wool for these coverlets was spun (and often dyed) at home and then delivered to a local weaver who made up the coverlet.

Summer-winter coverlets were reversible, and the summer-winter term refers to the structure not the color. The summer-winter coverlet should not be confused with double weave and is more closely related to overshot. Like double weave, it is dark on one side and light on the other but there is only one layer of cloth, therefore it is much lighter in mass and thickness.

Following the introduction of the jacquard loom in the early 1820s, machine-woven coverlets in large-scale floral designs became popular.

See also
Linsey-woolsey

Notes

References

Weissman, Judith Reiter and Wendy Lavitt: Labors of Love: America's Textiles and Needlwork, 1650-1930, New York, Wings Books, 1987, 
Allstand Cottage Industries brochure at the Hunter Library Digital Collections, retrieved 20 June 2007
Kelly, Andrew: Kentucky by Design: The Decorative Arts and American Culture, Lexington, University Press of Kentucky, 2015, 
 MADISON ALCEDO, DIY Chunky Knit Blanket Tutorials For Mastering the Cozy Viral Trend

External links

Coverlets Special Exhibit (1830s-1870s) the Allison-Antrim Museum, Greencastle, Pennsylvania
 Illinois Jacquard Coverlets and Weavers
 Illinois Jacquard Coverlets and Weavers: End of a Legacy
Craft Revival: Shaping Western North Carolina Past and Present - Coverlets
The National Museum of the American Coverlet - Bedford, PA

Weaving
Textile arts of the United States